Zosimus (Greek: Ζωσιμος) was a Christian martyr who was executed in Spoleto, Umbria, Italy, during the reign of Emperor Trajan. His feast day is June 19.

Notes

110 deaths
Italian saints
2nd-century Christian martyrs
Year of birth unknown